The Birmingham Hebrew Congregation, commonly known as the Singers Hill Synagogue, is an Orthodox Jewish synagogue in Birmingham, England. The synagogue is a Grade II* listed building, comprising 26, 26A and 26B Blucher Street in the city centre.

Built in 1856, it was designed by Yeoville Thomason. It replaced the Greek Revival, 1827 Severn Street Synagogue, which survives as a Masonic Hall, and was the fourth synagogue building to be erected in the city.

It features "a Norman-wheel window in a building design in red and yellow brick, which combined neo-classical, Romanesque, and Italianate details, and used a classical basilica plan, with a central Bimah".

The stained glass windows were commissioned from Hardman Studios in 1956-1963, in a process overseen by the former chairman of the Synagogue's council, Joseph Cohen.

References

External links 

Birmingham Hebrew Congregation on Jewish Communities and Records - UK (hosted by jewishgen.org).
BBC 360 degree internal views
Jewish Birmingham - Birmingham City Council
Looking at Buildings - Pevsner Architectural Guides

Ashkenazi Jewish culture in England
Ashkenazi synagogues
Orthodox synagogues in England
Grade II* listed buildings in Birmingham
Grade II* listed religious buildings and structures
Religious buildings and structures in Birmingham, West Midlands
Synagogues completed in 1856
1730 establishments in England